February Son is the second studio album and major label debut from post-grunge band Oleander. It was produced by Steven Haigler and released on Universal Records on February 23, 1999, and was certified gold on May 5, 2000. February Son contains some of Oleander's most successful singles. It included new drummer Scott Devours who was hired to replace the band's original drummer, Fred Nelson Jr. Most of the songs on the album had been previously released on the band's independent debut. The album has been certified gold in sales by the RIAA.

Promotion and touring
The album features Oleander's breakout lead single, "Why I'm Here," and "I Walk Alone." The latter had a music video while the lead single was featured on the popular TV series Dawson's Creek, as well as in the films American Pie and Scary Movie 2. A cover of The Cure's "Boys Don't Cry" would serve as a UK single supported by a video in the summer of 2000. Directed by Cousin Mike, the video stars Bloodhound Gang leader Jimmy Pop who played a nerdy man living in an apartment. Oleander surrounds him as they loudly perform the song, forcing him to weep. Frontman Thomas Flowers explained that the song "really typifies and exemplifies everything that I'm already trying to say on the album."

In promotion of February Son, the group opened for headliners Creed and Our Lady Peace. They also performed at Woodstock '99. In December 1999, Oleander and Kid Rock performed a charity concert for the Atlanta Community Food Bank. The band also played a New Year's Eve concert with Fastball at the Sacramento Convention Center.

Reception

February Son received some criticism for allegedly imitating the influential grunge flagship Nirvana, particularly on "Why I'm Here" which begins with a similar note pattern as "Heart-Shaped Box."  However, despite the accusation, other songs were cited as having unique and enjoyable melodies, and the album managed to sell over a half-million copies.

Adrianne Stone of Rolling Stone wrote, "Razor sharp guitars on 'Lost Cause,' violin enhancing the warm tones of first single 'Why I'm Here,' and a surprise false ending on 'Never Again' are typical augmentations on a riff-laden album that hints of Nirvana's pained alterna-pop."

Track listing

Personnel
Oleander
 Thomas Flowers – Lead vocals, rhythm guitar
 Doug Eldridge – Bass guitar
 Ric Ivanisevich – Lead guitar
 Fred Nelson, Jr. – Drums

Production
 Steven Haigler – Producer, engineering, mixing
 Ted Jensen – Mastering
 Mike Crenshaw – Assistant engineering
 P.R. Brown – Art Direction

Additional personnel 
Jonathan Mover
Rich Mouser
Kristina Kopriva
Steven "Tambourine Man" Haigler

Charts

Singles

Certifications

External links
 "Boys Don't Cry" video on Yahoo! Music
 "I Walk Alone" video on Yahoo! Music

References

Oleander (band) albums
1999 albums
Universal Records albums